Asota trinacria is a moth of the family Erebidae first described by Georg Semper in 1899. It is found in Borneo, Seram and the Philippines (Leyte, Luzon, Mindoro and Mindanao).

References

Asota (moth)
Moths of Asia
Moths described in 1899